Morad Dahandeh (also Romanized as Morād Dahandeh) is a village in Layl Rural District, in the Central District of Lahijan County, Gilan Province, Iran. At the 2006 census, its population was 208, in 58 families.

References 

Populated places in Lahijan County